Gölyaka District is a district of the Düzce Province of Turkey. Its seat is the town of Gölyaka. Its area is 228 km2, and its population is 20,552 (2022).

Composition
There is one municipality in Gölyaka District:
 Gölyaka

There are 21 villages in Gölyaka District:

 Açma
 Aksu
 Bakacak
 Bekiroğlu
 Çamlıbel
 Çayköy
 Değirmentepe
 Güzeldere
 Hacısüleymanbey
 Hacıyakup
 Hamamüstü
 İçmeler
 Kemeryanı
 Muhapdede
 Saçmalıpınar
 Sarıdere
 Taşlık
 Yazlık
 Yeşilova
 Yunusefendi
 Zekeriyaköy

References

Districts of Düzce Province